The Museum of Lithographed Tin Cans is a museum in Grand-Hallet in the Hannuit area in Belgium. De tin cans dating from 1868 to date were collected since 1988 by Yvette Dardenne, who is the owner of the museum. It is the largest collection of lithographed tins in the world. Het collection is spread over three buildings and is sorted into themes s much as possible. Visiting the museum is only possible by appointment. A visit with a tour takes about two hours. For children there is also a mini-zoo.

Collection 
As of 2017 the collection exceeds 57000 tin cans. Some remarkable items are:
 A 100000 Reichsmark Bonbon, E Wolff's Nachfolger, Strassburg-Neudorf
 A lunch box with images of President Paul Kruger
 A KLM plane
 The ship Normandie

Images

External links 

Packaging
Hannut
Museums in Liège Province